Science Centre is an underground light rail transit (LRT) station and mobility hub under construction on Line 5 Eglinton, a new line that is part of the Toronto subway system.  It will be located in the Flemingdon Park neighbourhood at the intersection of Don Mills Road and Eglinton Avenue. It is scheduled to open in 2023.

During the planning stages for Line 5 Eglinton, the station was given the working name "Don Mills". On November 23, 2015, a report to the TTC Board recommended giving a unique name to each station in the subway system (including Line 5 Eglinton). Thus, it was given its current name to both be more descriptive of the nearby Ontario Science Centre (in the same vein as Museum station), and to avoid confusion with the pre-existing Don Mills station on Line 4 Sheppard.

On April 10, 2019, the Ontario Government announced that Science Centre station would be the northern terminus for the proposed Ontario Line, construction of which started in March 2022.

Description
This station's main entrance will be built adjacent to the Ontario Science Centre at the southwest corner of the intersection with Don Mills Road. A secondary entrance will be on the opposite northeast corner, with a new bus terminal stretching beyond that to Gervais Drive. The TTC bus terminal will have seven bus bays as well as on-street bus connections. An underground, accessible passage will link the bus terminal to the LRT concourse level, which will have retail spaces. The station will provide 30 outdoor and 30 indoor bicycle parking spaces.

The underground Science Centre station was built using cut-and-cover methodology. The station is between two surface sections of the line. To travel under Don Mills Road, the line dips underground, passes through the station under the middle of Eglinton Avenue and re-emerges to the surface at the other side. To the west of Science Centre station, there is a facing-point crossover just beyond the ramp descending to the station's west portal. To the east of the station, there is a double crossover on the ramp descending to the station's east portal.

As part of a program to install artworks at major interchange stations along Line 5 Eglinton, Science Centre Station will feature an artwork titled Total Lunar Eclipse by British-American artist Sarah Morris. The artwork is a mural consisting of porcelain tiles that were silkscreened by hand. According to the artist, the artwork is a "wall painting" that "invites reflection on concepts of light, scale and motion through space".

The station's main entrance has louvres in the glass panels above the doors. Metrolinx predicts that the louvres "will be a well-known and a distinctive part of the transit destination's look".

Nearby landmarks
Destinations include the Ontario Science Centre, the Flemingdon Park neighbourhood, the Celestica headquarters, the Foresters building, Real Canadian Superstore, and a Latter-day Saints meetinghouse.

Science Centre is one of the Crosstown stations that has been reported to have most excited developers.  On April 3, 2017, Urban Toronto reported that the City's planning department's initiative for intersection had been named "Don Mills Crossing", while it would be accompanied by a plan for nearby properties, in 2018.

Surface connections 

, the following are the proposed connecting routes that would serve this station when Line 5 Eglinton opens:

References

External links

Don Mills Station project page at the Eglinton Crosstown website.
  by Infrastructure Ontario. (The video shows the old station name (Don Mills) which has since been renamed Science Centre.)

Line 5 Eglinton stations